The Mister Nicaragua is the national beauty contest for men in Nicaragua. It was founded in 2000.

History
Mister Nicaragua is not broadcast on television since it is a new program. It is held annually though it is in need of funds, being not as important as Miss Nicaragua. The current director of Mister Nicaragua is Mister Julio Guadamuz.

Mission
Mister Nicaragua titleholder expected to export outside culture, art and beauty of the Nicaraguan man, and highlight their talents and male presence in international competitions.

Titleholders

List of Mister Nicaragua at International pageants
Color key

Manhunt International

Mister International

References 
 15 candidatos quieren ser Mister Nicaragua
 ¿Quién es el hombre más guapo de Nicaragua?

External links
Official website

Beauty pageants in Nicaragua
Male beauty pageants
Recurring events established in 2000
Nicaraguan awards